Routledge Philosophy Guidebook to Hegel and the Phenomenology of Spirit is a 2002 book by the philosopher Robert Stern, in which the author provides an introduction to The Phenomenology of Spirit by Hegel.

Reception
Simon Lumsden and Terry Pinkard have reviewed the book.
A review of the Persian translation of the book has been published in the PTMBR.

References

External links 
 Full Text of the Book

2002 non-fiction books
English-language books
Books about Georg Wilhelm Friedrich Hegel
Routledge books